"Anything Goes!" is a song by Japanese recording artist Maki Ohguro, her 32nd single in her over twenty-year-long career. The song serves as the opening theme of the 2010-2011 Kamen Rider Series Kamen Rider OOO. The single for the song was released on November 17, 2010, as a standard CD release and a CD+DVD release featuring the music video for the song. On September 15, 2010, Avex released the opening sequence edit of the song to digital music outlets. The single includes 3 variations of the song: the single cut, a ska edit, and the instrumental track. Japan-based rapper Rah-D is featured on the track. "Anything Goes!" is Maki Ohguro's first single in 11 years to break the top 10 of the Oricon at number 7, after selling 33,000 copies in its first week of release.

A balladic version of the song titled "Anything Goes! “Ballad”" was played during the final scenes of the finale of Kamen Rider OOO. Ohguro stated that she thought that the song would also work as a slow ballad, especially after she has been watching how the series has progressed, and recorded the song during her hiatus from releases. She also expressed how she think her children would react when they grow up and watch the future Kamen Rider shows, believing they will think she was cool for having recorded the Kamen Rider OOO theme song. The balladic version was initially to be released as a single on October 19, 2011, but was eventually pushed back to December 7 of that year.

Track listing
The complete track listing has not been confirmed.

"Anything Goes!" — 3:33
"Anything Goes! (Ska Foundation Edit.)" — 3:13
"Anything Goes! (Instrumental)" — 3:31

DVD track listing
"Anything Goes! (Music Film)"

Digital release
"Anything Goes! (TV ver.)" — 1:12

Charts

Sales and certifications

References

External links
Kamen Rider OOO site  at Avex Group
"Anything Goes!" at Maki Ohguro's official site

2010 singles
Japanese-language songs
Japanese television drama theme songs
Songs with lyrics by Shoko Fujibayashi
Kamen Rider
Avex Trax singles
2010 songs